Fjugesta is a locality and the seat of Lekeberg Municipality, Örebro County, Sweden, with 2,033 inhabitants in 2010.

Fjugesta is the hometown of Southeastern Louisiana University international English writing teacher Birgitta Ramsey.

In Sweden, Fjugesta is widely identified with "Fjugesta-mordet" (the Fjugesta murder), for which Swedish Olympic athlete Olle Möller was convicted.

Compared to many settlements of its size, Fjugesta has a very rich history of local business and industry. Currently it has multiple repair shops for automotive vehicles and tune-up stores, but also multiple independent carpeting businesses.

References 

Municipal seats of Örebro County
Populated places in Örebro County
Populated places in Lekeberg Municipality
Swedish municipal seats